William J. Gannon (born July 9, 1937) was an American politician in the state of Iowa.

Gannon was born in Mingo, Iowa. He was a farmer. He served in the Iowa House of Representatives from 1965 to 1971 as a Democrat.

References

1937 births
Living people
People from Jasper County, Iowa
Farmers from Iowa
Democratic Party members of the Iowa House of Representatives